The comparison of the performances of all the clubs that participated in the UEFA Champions League is presented below. The qualifying rounds are not taken into account.

Classification

Performance

See also
 UEFA Champions League
 European Cup and UEFA Champions League records and statistics
 UEFA Europa League clubs performance comparison
 UEFA Europa Conference League clubs performance comparison
 AFC Champions League clubs performance comparison

Notes

References

Clubs performance comparison
Association football comparisons